Jiuqutang, formerly spelled Jioucyutang, is a railway station on the Taiwan Railways Administration Pingtung line located in Dashu District, Kaohsiung, Taiwan.

History

The station was opened on 1 October 1907. The current main station hall replaced the original 1907 station. Additional east exit with fully accessible overpass was added during renovations from 2016 to 2018.

Around the station
 Sanhe Tile Kiln
 Taiwan Pineapple Museum
 Old Gaoping River Iron Bridge historic bridge spans Gaoping River and built during Japanese rule of Taiwan.

See also
 List of railway stations in Taiwan

References

1907 establishments in Taiwan
Railway stations in Kaohsiung
Railway stations opened in 1907
Railway stations served by Taiwan Railways Administration